The 1927 Allan Cup was the senior ice hockey championship for the Canadian Amateur Hockey Association for the 1926–27 season. According to CAHA president Frank Sandercock, the profit of C$16,000 from the 1927 Allan Cup exceeded the combined profits from 1923 to 1926.

Final 
Best-of-three format:

Fort William 2 Toronto 2
Fort William 3 Toronto 2
Toronto 4 Fort William 1
Toronto 2 Fort William 1

Toronto Varsity Grads beat Fort William Thundering Herd 2-1, 1 tie on series.

References

External links
Allan Cup archives 
Allan Cup website

 
Allan Cup
Allan Cup